Shrek Forever After is a 2010 American computer-animated comedy film loosely based on the 1990 children's picture book Shrek! by William Steig. Directed by Mike Mitchell and written by Josh Klausner and Darren Lemke, it is the sequel to Shrek the Third (2007) and the fourth installment in the Shrek film series. The film stars Mike Myers, Eddie Murphy, Cameron Diaz, Antonio Banderas, Julie Andrews, and John Cleese reprising their voice roles from the previous films, with Walt Dohrn, Jane Lynch, Jon Hamm, Craig Robinson, Lake Bell, Mary Kay Place, Kathy Griffin, and Kristen Schaal joining the cast. The plot follows Shrek who struggles with the responsibilities and stress of being a domesticated family man, yearning for the days he was once feared and lived in solitude. He is tricked by Rumpelstiltskin into signing a contract that leads to disastrous consequences.

Shrek Forever After premiered at the Tribeca Film Festival on April 21, 2010, and was theatrically released in the United States by Paramount Pictures on May 21, 2010. The film debuted as the top-grossing film at the box office, a position it held for three consecutive weeks in the United States and Canada. It received mixed reviews from critics, but grossed a worldwide total of $756 million and becoming the fifth-highest-grossing film of 2010. In addition, Shrek Forever After became DreamWorks Animation's second-highest-grossing film at the foreign box office. Although originally intended to be the final main entry in the series, a fifth Shrek film reportedly entered development in the years following the release of Forever After, but it has experienced multiple delays. A spin-off prequel film, Puss in Boots, was released on October 28, 2011, with Banderas reprising his role, after which a television series continuation, The Adventures of Puss in Boots, aired on Netflix from January 2015 to January 2018, and a sequel film, set after the Shrek films and titled Puss in Boots: The Last Wish, was released on December 21, 2022.

Plot

In a flashback, King Harold and Queen Lillian are about to sign the kingdom of Far Far Away over to Rumpelstiltskin ("Rumpel") in exchange for lifting the curse of their daughter, Princess Fiona – cursed to transform into an ogre nightly and locked in a tower until rescued by her "true love". Before signing, news arrives that she had been saved, and they cancel the deal. In the present, Rumpel has become an outcast and wishes that Fiona's rescuer, Shrek, was never born.

Meanwhile, Shrek has grown increasingly tired of being a family man and celebrity, longing for the days when he was feared and had privacy. While celebrating his children's first birthday in Far Far Away, an escalating series of mishaps injuring Shrek's ego causes him to walk out in anger and lash out at Fiona. Having witnessed the outburst, Rumpel follows Shrek into the forest and stages a scene of being in distress, prompting Shrek to help. Invited inside Rumpel's carriage, Shrek laments that he is no longer a "real ogre". Rumpel offers him a deal to receive a day as a "real ogre" in exchange for a day from his childhood. Shrek signs a contract fulfilling this wish, and is whisked away into an alternate reality.

Now feared by the villagers, Shrek causes some lighthearted mischief, until he discovers that Fiona is a fugitive and his swamp is deserted and desolate. Captured by witches, Shrek is taken to Rumpel, who is now the king of Far Far Away. Rumpel reveals to Shrek that he took the day he was born, meaning Shrek never existed in this altered timeline. Consequently, Harold and Lillian were forced to sign the kingdom over to Rumpel, causing them to disappear. When the day ends, Shrek will cease to exist.

Shrek escapes Rumpel's castle with Donkey, who is initially terrified of Shrek but befriends him after seeing him cry over his erased history. Donkey helps Shrek find a hidden exit clause; the contract can be nullified by "true love's kiss". The pair soon encounter a still-cursed Fiona leading an army of ogres in a resistance against Rumpel, and a lazy and overweight Puss in Boots being kept as Fiona's pet. Shrek unsuccessfully tries to woo Fiona, who has since lost hope of finding true love after not being rescued, and is too busy preparing an ambush on Rumpel. Puss encourages Shrek to continue pursuing Fiona.

During the ambush, most of the ogres are captured by the Pied Piper, who was hired by Rumpel, but Shrek and Fiona escape with Puss and Donkey. Shrek insists that Fiona kiss him, assuring her that it will fix everything; she reluctantly obliges, but to Shrek's surprise, nothing happens. Later on, Rumpel publicly offers a wish to anyone who brings him Shrek, and after hearing this, Shrek turns himself in. Rumpel is forced to grant Shrek's wish, and he uses it to free the other ogres. As Shrek is locked up, Rumpel reveals that Fiona had been captured and not released, since she is not "all ogre". Donkey, Puss, and the freed ogres storm the castle; they capture Rumpel and defeat his witch army, while Shrek and Fiona take down Dragon.

As the sun rises, Shrek begins to fade from existence, but Fiona, having fallen in love with him, kisses him just before he disappears. Seeing that she is still an ogre in the sunlight, Fiona realizes that her curse was broken and that she has assumed "love's true form". The alternate reality disintegrates, taking Rumpelstiltskin with it while everyone disappears, and Shrek finds himself transported back to the original timeline at the moment before he lost his temper at the party. Instead of lashing out, Shrek embraces his family and friends with a newfound appreciation for them.

Voice cast

 Mike Myers as Shrek
 Eddie Murphy as Donkey
 Cameron Diaz as Princess Fiona
 Antonio Banderas as Puss in Boots
 Walt Dohrn as Rumpelstiltskin
 Jon Hamm as Brogan the Ogre
 Jane Lynch as Gretched the Ogre
 Craig Robinson as Cookie the Ogre
 Lake Bell as Patrol Witch, Wagon Witch No. 2
 Kathy Griffin as Dancing Witch, Wagon Witch No. 1
 Mary Kay Place as Witch Guard No. 1
 Kristen Schaal as Pumpkin Witch, Palace Witch
 Julie Andrews as Queen Lillian
 John Cleese as King Harold
 Conrad Vernon as Gingerbread Man
 Aron Warner as Wolf
 Christopher Knights as Blind Mice
 Cody Cameron as Pinocchio, Three Pigs
 Dante James Hauser as Fergus
 Chris Miller as Magic Mirror, Geppetto
 Meredith Vieira as Broomsy Witch
 Jeremy Steig as Pied Piper
 Larry King as Doris the Ugly Stepsister
 Regis Philbin as Mabel the Ugly Stepsister
 Mike Mitchell as Witch Guard No. 2, Butter Pants
 Ryan Seacrest as Father of Butter Pants

Production
Following the success of Shrek 2, a third and fourth Shrek film, along with plans for a fifth and final film, were announced in May 2004 by Jeffrey Katzenberg. In October 2006, DreamWorks Animation revealed that the fourth film would be released in 2010.

In October 2007, Katzenberg announced a title for the fourth film, Shrek Goes Fourth, explaining that "Shrek goes out into the world, forth!" In May 2009, however, DreamWorks Animation retitled the film to Shrek Forever After, indicating that it would be the last in the Shrek series. In November 2009, Bill Damaschke, head of creative production at DreamWorks Animation, confirmed with "All that was loved about Shrek in the first film is brought to the final film."

Tim Sullivan was hired to write the script in March 2005, but was later replaced by Darren Lemke and Josh Klausner. Klausner, about the script's evolution, said, "When I first came onto the project, it wasn't supposed to be the final chapter—there were originally going to be 5 Shrek movies. Then, about a year into the development, Jeffrey Katzenberg decided that the story that we'd come up with was the right way for Shrek's journey to end, which was incredibly flattering." In May 2007, shortly before the release of the third film, it was announced Mike Mitchell would be on board to direct the new installment. Much of the film was written and recorded in New York City.

Music

Like the other Shrek films, the film's original score was composed by British composer Harry Gregson-Williams.

Release

Theatrical
Shrek Forever After premiered at the Tribeca Film Festival on April 21, 2010. It was publicly released on May 20, 2010, in Russia, while the American release followed the next day. The film was also released in IMAX 3D format. In July 2014, the film's distribution rights were purchased by DreamWorks Animation from Paramount Pictures and transferred to 20th Century Fox before reverting to Universal Pictures in 2018.

Home media
Shrek Forever After (marketed as Shrek Forever After: The Final Chapter) was released on DVD and Blu-ray on December 7, 2010. The film has made $76.5 million in DVD and Blu-ray sales. The film is also included in Shrek: The Whole Story, a box set released on the same day that included all four Shrek movies and additional bonus content.

Merchandise
In 2010, McDonald's released a series of drinking glasses which featured painted characters from Shrek Forever After. The painted designs contained the toxic metal cadmium, which provided concerns about the long-term exposure of cadmium from the Shrek glasses. As a result, McDonald's offered a recall of the 12 million drinking glasses and paid customers to return them.

Reception

Box office
Shrek Forever After earned $238.7 million in North America, and $513.9 million in other countries, for a worldwide total of $752.6 million, making it the fifth highest-grossing film of 2010.

Shrek Forever After had the widest release for an animated film (4,359 theaters, later expanded to 4,386) in North America. On its opening day (May 21, 2010), it ranked No.1, grossing $20.8 million, which was lower than the opening days of the last two Shrek films. The film then opened in three days with $70.8 million, lower than box office analysts' predictions of an opening of $105 million and also lower than the two previous films of the franchise. Anne Globe, head of worldwide marketing for DreamWorks Animation, said they were "happy with the film's opening" since it debuted at No. 1 and also had the fourth-best opening for an animated film, at the time, in the United States and Canada. Shrek Forever After was the number one film for three consecutive weekends.

In North America, executives at DreamWorks Animation were impressed because the film earned $238.7 million in North America, although it was the fourth film in the series, seemingly being outgrown by its fans. It ended its box office run ranked domestically as the ninth highest-grossing film of 2010.

Outside North America, it topped the weekend box office once on July 16–18, 2010 with $46.3 million. In Russia and CIS, its second-highest-grossing country, it had a $19.7 million opening weekend which was a record among animated films. It earned $51.4 million in total. Third in total earnings came the United Kingdom, Ireland and Malta, where it opened with £8.96 million ($13.6 million) and finished its box office run with £31.1 million ($51.1 million).

Critical response
On review aggregation website Rotten Tomatoes, Shrek Forever After had an approval rating of 57% based on 201 reviews and an average rating of 5.90/10. The site's critical consensus read, "While not without its moments, Shrek Forever After too often feels like a rote rehashing of the franchise's earlier entries." On Metacritic, the film had a weighted average score of 58 out of 100, based on 35 critics, indicating "mixed or average reviews". Audiences polled by CinemaScore gave the film an average grade of "A" on an A+ to F scale, the same score earned by Shrek and Shrek 2 and a step up from the "B+" earned by Shrek the Third.

Stephen Holden of The New York Times stated "What fortifies “Shrek Forever After” are its brilliantly realized principal characters, who nearly a decade after the first “Shrek” film remain as vital and engaging fusions of image, personality and voice as any characters in the history of animation." Pete Hammond of BoxOffice gave the film four and a half out of five stars and wrote, "Hilarious and heartfelt from start to finish, this is the best Shrek of them all, and that's no fairy tale. Borrowing liberally from Frank Capra's It's a Wonderful Life, this edition blends big laughs and emotion to explore what Far Far Away might have been like if Shrek never existed." James Berardinelli of Reelviews awarded the film three out of four stars and wrote, "Even though Shrek Forever After is obligatory and unnecessary, it's better than Shrek the Third and it's likely that most who attend as a way of saying goodbye to the Jolly Green Ogre will not find themselves wishing they had sought out a more profitable way of spending 90-odd minutes."

James White of Empire gave the film four out of four stars, saying, "DreamWorks could be entering a period of fresh creativity. With How to Train Your Dragon and a balanced, darker-hued and very funny Shrek finale, they've found the magic again". Lisa Schwarzbaum of Entertainment Weekly gave the film a "B−" grade, saying "Everyone involved fulfills his or her job requirements adequately. But the magic is gone and Shrek Forever After is no longer an ogre phenomenon to reckon with." Peter Travers of Rolling Stone wrote "It's a fun ride. What's missing is the excitement of a new interpretation." Mary Pols of Time stated in her review "Can an ogre jump a shark? I think so." 

Giving the film one star out of four, Kyle Smith of the New York Post wrote, "After the frantic spurt of fairy-tale allusions and jokes in the first three Shreks, this one inches along with a few mostly pointless action scenes and the occasional mild pun."

Accolades

Video game

Shrek Forever After is an action-adventure video game based on the movie of the same name. It was released by Activision on May 18, 2010.

Future

Possible sequel

In 2014, a Fox Business Network interview with Dreamworks CEO Jeffrey Katzenberg implied that more Shrek films would eventually be made saying, "But I think you can be confident that we'll have another chapter in the Shrek series. We're not finished and, more importantly, neither is he." Following NBCUniversal acquisition of DreamWorks Animation in 2016, President and CEO Steve Burke discussed plans to revive the franchise. In July 2016, The Hollywood Reporter cited sources saying that a fifth film was planned for a 2019 release. By late 2016, reports surfaced that the script had been completed.

Spin-offs

Puss in Boots is a computer-animated adventure comedy film that was released on October 28, 2011. A prequel to the Shrek films, the film is based on and follows the origin story of the character of the same name, and his adventures with Kitty Softpaws and mastermind Humpty Dumpty.

A sequel, titled Puss in Boots: The Last Wish was released on December 21, 2022. Taking place after the events of Shrek Forever After, it follows the title character down to his last life and seeking to restore his previous eight lives with the mystical Last Wish, lost while escaping new enemies who plan to hunt him down, with the help of his friends, including Softpaw.

Notes

References

External links 
 
 
 
 
 
 

2010 films
2010s American animated films
2010s fantasy comedy films
2010 computer-animated films
2010 3D films
3D animated films
American 3D films
American children's animated comedy films
American children's animated fantasy films
American computer-animated films
American fantasy comedy films
American sequel films
Animated films about dragons
Animated films about animals
Brothers Grimm
Shrek_4
Fairy tale parody films
Films about royalty
Films about wish fulfillment
Films based on Pied Piper of Hamelin
Films directed by Mike Mitchell
Films scored by Harry Gregson-Williams
Films set in the Middle Ages
IMAX films
Midlife crisis films
Paramount Pictures animated films
Paramount Pictures films
Films with screenplays by Darren Lemke
Films with screenplays by Josh Klausner
Shrek_4
Animated films about time travel
Films about witchcraft
Alternate timeline films
2010 comedy films
2010s English-language films